The 1962 Orange Bowl   was the 28th edition of the college football bowl game, played at the Orange Bowl in Miami, Florida, on Monday, January 1. Part of the 1961–62 bowl game season, the fourth-ranked LSU Tigers of the Southeastern Conference (SEC) defeated the #7 Colorado Buffaloes of the Big Eight Conference, 25–7.

Teams

Colorado

LSU

LSU implemented their "three-platoon system." which included the "Chinese Bandits" defensive unit.

Game summary
The game kicked off at 1 pm and was played in a drizzle, the first rain at an Orange Bowl.

Scoring
First quarter
LSU - FG-Wendell Harris 30 yds; 3–0 LSU
LSU - Safety-punt blocked out of end zone; 5–0 LSU
Second quarter
Colo - TD-Loren Schweninger 59-yard interception return (Hillebrand kick); 5–7 Colorado
LSU - TD-Charles Cranford 1-yard run (2-point conversion failed); 11–7 LSU
Third quarter
LSU - TD-Jimmy Field 9-yard run (Harris kick); 18–7 LSU
LSU - TD-Gene Sykes recovered blocked punt in end zone (Harris kick); 25–7 LSU
Fourth quarter
No scoring

Aftermath
It was the final game for both head coaches: Colorado's Sonny Grandelius was fired in March in the wake of numerous NCAA rule violations, and Paul Dietzel left for Army, then returned to LSU as athletic director in 1978.

The next season, Colorado won just two games under interim head coach Bud Davis (who later served as LSU's Chancellor), who was succeeded by Eddie Crowder in January 1963. 
The program's next appearance in a major bowl was after the 1976 season, also in the Orange.

LSU's next major bowl appearance was the following year, with a shutout win in the Cotton; their next Orange Bowl was in January 1971. Charles McClendon, Dietzel's top assistant, ascended to head coach and remained through the 1979 season, compiling a 137-59-7 record. McClendon remains LSU winningest coach as of 2022.

References

Orange Bowl
Orange Bowl
Colorado Buffaloes football bowl games
LSU Tigers football bowl games
January 1962 sports events in the United States
Orange Bowl